Anomis mesogona is a moth of the family Erebidae first described by Francis Walker in 1857. It is found in India, Sri Lanka, Somalia and Japan.

The caterpillar is known to feed on Citrus, Lantana camara, Rosa, Rubus and Vitis species.

References

Moths of Asia
Moths described in 1857